Lemonade and Brownies is the debut studio album by the American rock band Sugar Ray, released on April 4, 1995, by Atlantic Records. It was produced by the band's director friend Joseph McGinty "McG" Nichol and executive produced by DJ Lethal. Actress Nicole Eggert is featured on the cover. Even though the album did not chart and was a commercial and critical failure for Atlantic Records, the band stayed on the label, going on to huge success.

The music video for "Mean Machine" was featured in a Beavis and Butt-Head episode "Bang the Drum Slowly Dumbass".

Musical style
AllMusic describe the album as being "sub-Chili Peppers shuck-and-jive." The Rolling Stone Encyclopedia of Rock & Roll (2001) states that Sugar Ray was initially influenced by "a variety of sounds: Red Hot Chili Peppers-style punk-funk, reggae grooves, metal, hip hop, and a little bit of retro new wave." In her 2000 Sugar Ray biography book, author Anna Louise Golden states that people at the time considered the band's sound to be "putting the funk into music that was perilously close to metal."

Reception
The album received generally mixed to negative reviews upon its release. Stephen Thomas Erlewine of AllMusic wrote that the album is "a competent set of alternative funk/metal", but noted that "nothing on Lemonade & Brownies is particularly distinctive." In 1995, the Los Angeles Times labelled it "juvenile", and added that "with the album’s cheesecake artwork and infantile, toilet-humor title, it’s clear Sugar Ray is factoring its appeal down to lowest denominators with this debut CD." They further wrote, "what’s most galling about Lemonade and Brownies is how cannily it is put together to seduce young headbangers and hip-hoppers. The album’s chugging metal riffs and shout-along refrains, its rapped sloganeering, its poppy hooks, and its ear-teasing production touches (DJ Lethal of House of Pain gets production credit, along with Sugar Ray’s O.C. homeboy, McG) give it the dumb-fun appeal that’s the essence of frat rock."

Track listing
All songs written by McGrath, Sheppard, Karges, Frazier & McG
"Snug Harbor" – 0:50
"Rhyme Stealer" – 2:51
"Iron Mic" – 4:40
"Hold Your Eyes" – 3:29
"The Greatest" – 3:58
"Big Black Woman" – 1:43
"Mean Machine" – 2:41
"Dance Party USA" – 3:18
"10 Seconds Down" – 3:39
"Danzig Needs a Hug" – 3:07
"Drive By" – 1:58 (comedy skit)
"Caboose" – 3:13
"Scuzzboots" – 3:29
"Streaker" – 4:12
"One Brave Cowboy" – 1:37 (Hidden bonus track plays after 2 minutes of silence)

Japan bonus tracks
"White Minority" (Black Flag cover) – 1:03
"Wasted" – 0:49
"Wango Tango" (Ted Nugent cover) – 3:56
"Dr. J" (Live) – 3:11

Personnel

Sugar Ray
 Mark McGrath - lead vocals (credited as "Liar")
 Rodney Sheppard - guitars, backing vocals (credited as "Traitor")
 Murphy Karges - bass, backing vocals (credited as "Sellout")
 Stan Frazier - drums, backing vocals (credited as "Cheat")

Additional musicians
 DJ Lethal - turntables, samples
 DJ Homicide - additional scratches
 Janine Harris - additional vocals on "Danzig Needs a Hug"

Production
 McG - producer
 DJ Lethal - executive producer
 Jason Roberts - mixing
 Ben Wallach - engineer
 Tom Baker - mastering
 Barry "Lord" Conley, Steve Gallagher, Mon Agranat, Eric Fischer & John Ewing Jr. - additional engineers
 Chip Quigley & Lee Heiman - management
 Dante Ariola & Jay Papke - art direction and design
 Stephen Stickler & Dante Ariola - cover photography
 Melanie Nissen - additional photography

References

1995 debut albums
Sugar Ray albums
Atlantic Records albums
Funk metal albums
Nu metal albums by American artists
Rap metal albums